Pyrausta inornatalis, the inornate pyrausta moth, is a moth in the family Crambidae. It was described by Charles H. Fernald in 1885. It is found in United States, where it has been recorded from Arizona, California, Florida, Arkansas, Kansas, Louisiana, Missouri, Oklahoma, Tennessee and Texas. It is also found in Mexico.

The wingspan is about 13 mm. The forewings are uniform light vinous (wine colored) red or reddish pink. The hindwings are pale fuscous, but paler at the base and with vinous red along the outer margin. Adults have been recorded on wing from March to November.

The larval feed on Salvia species, including Salvia farinacea.

References

Moths described in 1885
inornatalis
Moths of North America